Blazing Gentlemen is the twentieth studio album by American musician Robert Pollard. It was released in December 2013 under Guided by Voices Records.

Track listing

References

2013 albums
Robert Pollard albums
Fire Records (UK) albums